Sunar (alternately, Sonar or Swarnkar) is a Hindu caste in India referring to the community of people who work as goldsmiths. The community is primarily Hindu, and found usually in Rajasthan, Uttar Pradesh, Madhya Pradesh, Gujrat and other Northern States.
in nepal sunar is also use soni as a caste .

Etymology
The term Sunar may derive from the Sanskrit suvarna kār, "worker in gold".

The Sunar are still involved in  their traditional occupation, that is being goldsmiths. There is however a steady process in taking up other occupations, and the community in Haryana and Punjab as whole is fairly successful, having produced several professionals.

Factions
The Sunars are divided into a large number of territorial and non-territorial groupings called alla. Some of the major alla are the Jhankhad, Santanpuriya, Lal sultaniya, Dekhalantiya, Mundaha, Bhigahiya, Parajiya, Samuhiya, Chilliya, Katiliya Kalidarwa, Naubastwal, Berehele, Gedehiya, Shahpuriya, Mathureke Paliya, Katkaria and Nimkheriya ,Vaibhaha . Each lineage is associated with a particular area. To which its ancestors belonged to. The Sunar use Soni, Seth, Swarnkar, Shah, Singh, Puri, Bhutani, Sonik, Kapoor, Mehra, Rastogi, Verma, Saraf etc. as their surnames. In Gujarat and Rajasthan, the community is also known as Soni. In Haryana, the Sunars are often known as Swarnakar, Soni, Suri and Verma, are their common surname. In Punjab and Rajasthan, Mair Rajput community work as goldsmiths.

See also
Mair caste

References

Further reading
R.K. Gupta, S.R. Bakshi. Studies In Indian History: Rajasthan Through The Ages The Heritage Of Rajputs (set Of 5 Vols.). Sarup & Sons, 2008. , 

 
Goldsmith castes
Social groups of Rajasthan
Social groups of Uttar Pradesh
Social groups of Haryana
Gold in India